Kace Bartley (born 9 July 1997 in London) is an English professional squash player. As of February 2018, she was ranked number 93 in the world. She has competed in many professional PSA tournaments and won the 2017 Solent Classic. She has also competed in the Squash Premier League.

References

1997 births
Living people
English female squash players